Eristalinus megacephalus is a species of hoverfly.

Description 
Eristalinus megacephalus has a black abdomen and golden horizontal stripes larger in males. It has a black thorax, legs with black tips, transparent, flexible wings, a large head and golden compound eyes with pale purple spots. Being about 8–11 mm long, it is a good pollinator, and uses Batesian mimicry to look like hymenopteran bees and scare away predators. Its appearance is also similar to bee flies (family Bombyliidae). The species is listed in 2: 63 of Rossi's publication Mantissa insectorum. There are no subspecies. It is the rarest species of the genus Eristalinus, and is common but not abundant.

The species's flight period is from May to October, and is most plentiful from June to July.

Distribution 
E. megacephalus can be found in most countries, including South Africa, Egypt, Sri Lanka, China, Taiwan, India, Java, Guam, Southern Spain, Turkey, North Africa, Iran, and coastal parts of Italy.

Gallery

See also 
Eristalinus quinquelineatus
Eristalinus taeniops
Eristalinus sepulchralis
Eristalinus fuscicornis
Eristalinus barclayi
Eristalinus seychellarum
Eristalinus aeneus

References 

Eristalinae
Diptera of Africa
Diptera of Asia
Diptera of Europe
Insects described in 1794
Taxa named by Pietro Rossi